Şehzade Mehmed Abid Efendi (17 May 1905 – 8 December 1973) was an Ottoman prince, the son of Sultan Abdul Hamid II and Saliha Naciye Kadın, and brother-in-law of King Zog I of Albania.

Early years
Şehzade Mehmed Abid was born on 17 May 1905 in the Yıldız Palace. His father was Abdul Hamid II, son of Abdulmejid I and Tirimüjgan Kadın. His mother was Saliha Naciye Kadın, daughter of Arslan Bey Ankuap. He was the eighth son born to his father, and the eldest child of his mother. He had a sister, Samiye Sultan three years younger than him, who died in infancy. He was named after Abdul Hamid's decreased brother, died in infancy.

On 27 April 1909, Abdul Hamid was deposed, and sent into exile in Thessaloniki. Abid and his mother followed Abdul Hamid. There they lived in Alatini Mansion. After Thessaloniki fell to Greece in 1912, Abdul Hamid returned to Istanbul, and settled in the Beylerbeyi Palace. His circumcision took place on 9 October 1913. Abdul Hamid died in 1918, when Abid was thirteen years of age.

Abid's early education took place in Galatasaray High School. He was thought painting by Halil Pasha, and his history tutor was Tevfik Bey. After graduating from here, he was enrolled in the Ottoman Military College, and went on to become senior lieutenant in the imperial Ottoman Army. He also served aide-de-camp to Sultan Mehmed VI. His mother died in 1923, when he was nineteen years of age.

Between 1918 and 1922, Abid lived in the Yıldız Palace, and between 1922 and 1924, he lived in the Erenköy Palace.

Exile
At the exile if the imperial family in March 1924, Abid first asked to go to Egypt but was denied enter, so he settled in Beirut, Lebanon. He used to spend most of the time in Jounieh with his eldest brother Şehzade Mehmed Selim, and  the summers in Aley. He then went to Paris, where he stayed with his older sister, Ayşe Sultan. Here he earned his living as a soap seller. On 14 January 1925, he gave the power of attorney to Sami Günzberg, a well-known Turkish Jewish lawyer, authorising him to regain from usurpers buildings, lands, mines, concessions left by Abdul Hamid situated in Turkish territory and elsewhere.

In Paris, he went to the Sorbonne Law School, and the Faculty of Political Sciences from where he graduated in 1936 and 1937 respectively. He received his doctorate in law from Sorbonne. He also went to Ecole Nationale des Langues Orientales Vivantes, where he graduated in Persian Language and Literature. Between 1940 and 1948, he lived for short periods in Toulouse, Nice, Madrid, Lisbon, Cairo, Alexandria and Tirana.
The Japanese emperor considered him a candidate for the throne of Turkistan; Zog I of Albania also thought of making him Crown Prince, as at the moment he had no issue.
Between 1936 and 1939, King Zog I of Albania, appointed him the Albanian Ambassador to France.

Personal life
In 1930, Abid asked 
Abdulmejid II and Mehisti Hanım's daughter, Dürrüşehvar Sultan's hand in marriage. However, her father refused, on the grounds of Dürrüşehvar being under age. In reality, he had already arranged his marriage with Azam Jah, a very wealthy Indian prince, son of the Nizam of Hyderabad, Mir Osman Ali Khan. The two married in 1931. In 1934, his marriage was arranged to Mihrişah Sultan, daughter of Şehzade Yusuf Izzeddin and Leman Hanım, but she was in love with Şehzade Ömer Faruk, who later became her husband, and then to the daughter of Nizam of Hyderabad State. However, none of them materialised.

Abid's first wife was Pınardil Fahriye Hanım. She died in 1934 in Nice, France, and was buried in Muslim Bobigny Cemetery. His second wife was Princess Senije Zogu, daughter of Xhemal Pasha Zogu and Sadije Toptani, and sister of King Zog I. They were betrothed on 9 January 1936 in Tirana, and were married on 13 January 1936. They divorced in 1949.

Death

In 1966, Mehmed Abid settled in Beirut, where he died of heart attack on 8 December 1973 and was buried in the cemetery of the Sulaymaniyya Takiyya, Damascus, Syria.

Personality
Abid was very smart, cultured and interested in history. In his last days he used to spend his time in libraries and bookstores. He could speak Turkish and French, and knew Arabic and Persian  He received many offers to write down his memories about his father. However, he turned down those offers. He would generally refuse the journalists requests to meet him. He was handsome, and would dress comely and cleanly. He spoke very little and was too modest.

Honours

Foreign honours 
 : Grand Cross of the Order of Fidelity of the Kingdom of Albania, 1936

Military ranks and army appointments
Senior Lieutenant, Ottoman Army

Honorary appointments
Aide-de-Camp to the Sultan

In literature
Şehzade Mehmed Abid is a character in Tim Symonds' historical novel Sherlock Holmes and The Sword of Osman (2015).

Ancestry

References

External links
 
 
 Family Tree, descendants of Sultan Mahmud II. Retrieved 2011-02-28.

1905 births
1973 deaths
Abdul Hamid II
Ottoman princes
People from the Ottoman Empire of Abkhazian descent
Burials in the cemetery of the Sulaymaniyya Takiyya